Wendy Kilbourne Read (born June 29, 1964) is an American attorney and former television actress.

Biography
Kilbourne may be best known as Constance Hazard on the North and South miniseries (1985, 1986 and 1994), and as Devon King in Midnight Caller. On the set of North and South, she met actor James Read, whom she married in 1988 and with whom she has three children: a son, Jackson (b. 1990), and two daughters—Willa, about whose 1994 stillbirth she opened up to columnist Robin Abcarian, and Sydney (b. 1995). The family resides in Santa Barbara, California.

She stopped working as an actress to attend law school, and is now a licensed attorney in California. She is the founder and CEO of The Children's Project of Santa Barbara, a residential charter school for foster children.

Selected filmography

Movies/TV Series

Series guest-appearances

References

External links
 
 Profile, talkingmoviezzz.blogspot.com/2007/08
 Profile, talkingmoviezzz.blogspot.com/2007/11

1964 births
Living people
American television actresses
Actresses from Los Angeles
Actresses from Santa Barbara, California
Lawyers from Los Angeles
American women lawyers
21st-century American women